Martin Volke (born January 17, 1982) is a Czech professional ice hockey goaltender. He played with HC Litvínov in the Czech Extraliga during the 2010–11 Czech Extraliga season.

References

External links 
 
 

1982 births
Czech ice hockey goaltenders
HC Litvínov players
Living people
Sportspeople from Ústí nad Labem
HC Most players
HC Stadion Litoměřice players